Seasons 52 is an American fresh grill and wine bar developed in 2003. The brand concept is to deliver a casually sophisticated atmosphere, seasonal menu, and offer fresh ingredients to deliver menu items that are naturally lighter. As of 2016, there are 42 Seasons 52 locations in the United States.

The restaurant's core menu changes four times a year with each season. The menu is printed weekly and includes limited time seasonal features "What's Good Now". Brian Phillips, their advanced sommelier, specifically visits different vineyards in order to hand pick wines for Seasons 52. The menu showcases over 100 different bottles of wine, 52 of which are available by the glass.

References

External links
 Official website
 Darden Restaurants, Inc. website

Companies based in Orlando, Florida
Restaurants established in 2003
Darden Restaurants brands
Restaurant chains in the United States
2003 establishments in Florida
American companies established in 2003